"Gusev" is an 1890 short story by Anton Chekhov.

Publication
According to Chekhov's 9 December letter to Alexey Suvorin, the story was partly based upon the real life incident, the burial at sea which he had witnessed on board the ship, when returning from Sakhalin.
It was first published in the 25 December (old style) 1890, No. 5326 (Christmas) issue of Novoye Vremya, with a note: "Colombo, 12 November".

Divided into five chapters and after some stylistic editing it was included into the Ward No. 6 1893 short stories collection and reproduced unchanged in its seven (1893–1899) editions. With some further minor corrections it was included by Chekhov into Volume 6 of his Collected Works, published by Adolf Marks in 1899–1901.

Synopsis
Several discharged soldiers, Gusev among them, and Pavel Ivanovich a man of whom nobody knows anything (and who later reveals himself to be the son of a priest), return home from the Far East by ship, in a hospital cabin, all apparently dying of consumption, seemingly indifferent to their condition. Gusev is a mild, slightly dim character who has difficulties understanding the diatribes of Pavel Ivanovich, an ardent  'protester' whose wont is to tell people 'truth to their faces' and who is now very proud of having riled every single person around him during his three years' service in the East. Pavel Ivanovich dies first, Gusev follows him several days later, his body in a sailcloth sack, after a short prayer also thrown down into the waves, submerging into a beautiful world of "...tender, joyous, passionate colours for which it is hard to find a name in human speech".

Reception
Among those who went on record as having lauded the story, were Pyotr Chaykovsky and Alexey Pleshcheyev, who wrote (on 12 January 1891): "Everybody there is delighted with the story in the Christmas edition of Novoye Vremya. This portrait of a 'protester' has been done masterfully".

"The whole of St Petersburg is mad about your Gusev", brother Alexander informed Chekhov in his 30 December 1890 letter.

References

External links
 Гусев, the original Russian text
 Gusev, two English translations

Short stories by Anton Chekhov
1890 short stories